Jesse Lee Petty (November 23, 1894 in Orr, Oklahoma – October 23, 1971), known as the Silver Fox, was a professional baseball pitcher in the major leagues from 1921 to 1930, for the Cleveland Indians, Brooklyn Robins, Pittsburgh Pirates and Chicago Cubs.

He managed in the minor leagues in 1935 and 1936 for the Knoxville Smokies of the Southern Association and the Hopkinsville Hoppers of the Kentucky–Illinois–Tennessee League.

External links

1894 births
1971 deaths
Major League Baseball pitchers
Baseball players from Oklahoma
Brooklyn Robins players
Chicago Cubs players
Pittsburgh Pirates players
Cleveland Indians players
Minor league baseball managers
San Antonio Bronchos players
New Orleans Pelicans (baseball) players
Waco Navigators players
Milwaukee Brewers (minor league) players
Indianapolis Indians players
Newark Bears (IL) players
Los Angeles Angels (minor league) players
Minneapolis Millers (baseball) players
Chattanooga Lookouts players